Budsin is an unincorporated community in the Town of Crystal Lake in Marquette County,  Wisconsin, centered on the junction of County Trunk Highway E and Wisconsin Highway 22.

Notable people
Martin E. Schreiber, Wisconsin State Representative and Milwaukee alderman, was born in Budsin; he was the father of a governor of Wisconsin Martin J. Schreiber.

Images

References

Unincorporated communities in Marquette County, Wisconsin
Unincorporated communities in Wisconsin